The Moosalb is a river, around ten kilometres long, in the Northern Black Forest in the German state of Baden-Württemberg. It discharges from the left into the Alb near Fischweier.

See also
List of rivers of Baden-Württemberg

References

Literature 
 TK25: topographic map, 1:25,000 series, Baden-Württemberg, Sheet No. 7116 Malsch

External links 
 
 , especially the map sections/layers
 of the Landesanstalt für Umwelt, Messungen und Naturschutz Baden-Württemberg (LUBW)
 "LUBW-FG10": Rivers and streams, 1:10,000 scale
 "LUBW-GEZG": Catchment areas
 "LUBW-SCHUTZ": various maps of the individual nature reserve categories

Rivers of Baden-Württemberg
Rivers of the Black Forest
Rivers of Germany